Regionalbus Lenzburg AG is a small company providing bus services to Lenzburg, in the Canton of Aargau, Switzerland, and its neighbouring villages.  The company operates 20 buses on 10 commercial routes, and in addition a night bus service which operates in the early hours of Saturday and Sunday mornings.

Fleet
As of January 2014 the fleet consisted of 20+ vehicles

References

External links
Official site

Bus companies of Switzerland
Transport in Switzerland
Public transport in Switzerland
Lenzburg